Antonio Joseph Gaynor (born 6 March 1946) is a former West Indian cricket umpire. He stood in six ODI games in 1986.

See also
 List of One Day International cricket umpires

References

1946 births
Living people
West Indian One Day International cricket umpires
Jamaican cricket umpires